Boer War usually refers to the Second Boer War (1899–1902), fought between the United Kingdom and the Boers of the Transvaal Republic and the Orange Free State.

Boer War may also refer to:
First Boer War (1880–1881), fought between the United Kingdom and the Boers of the Transvaal Republic

Other
The Boer War (film), a 1914 American film
The Great Boer War, a book  by Sir Arthur Conan Doyle
The Last Boer War, a book by Sir H. Rider Haggard
The Boer War, a 1979 book by Thomas Pakenham (historian)

See also

 
 Boer (disambiguation)